The Second Mohmand campaign of 1935 was a British military campaign against the Mohmand tribes in the Northwest Frontier area of British India, now Pakistan. Tanks were used, the first operational use of tanks in India. The First Mohmand campaign in 1897–98 followed earlier military expeditions in 1851–1852, 1854, 1864, 1879, 1880.  After the First Mohmand campaign, there was the Mohmand expedition of 1908 and the Mohmand and Bajaur operations of 1933, taking about a month in August.

In 1935 the Mohmands, influenced by the Haji of Turangzai and his three sons the Badshah Guls, were marauding in the plains. At the end of July about 2000 tribesmen were disrupting working parties repairing the Mohinand–Gandab road.

The Government decided to send a sizeable punitive force against them, called the Mohmand Force or Mohforce. The force, mobilised by 17 August, included the Nowshera and Peshawar Brigades of the Indian Army, a section of the Royal Tank Corps, the 18th King Edward's Own Cavalry, and the 22nd Derajat Mountain Battery (Frontier Force), with air support from the Indian Wing commanded by Basil Embry. The commanders of the Peshawar and Nowshera Brigades, Claude Auchinleck and Harold Alexander, both rose to high rank in World War II. Auchinleck, the senior Brigadier, commanded Mohforce; as the Peshawar District G.O.C. General Muspratt was on leave in Britain.

Mohforce left near the end of summer, with two tanks in front of the leading troops which could be used to outflank tribesman who pinned down the infantry. The tanks were Mark II light tanks, with a single Vickers machine gun. They did not have their radios, which had been withdrawn for their annual overhaul, so one tank had to act as a “runner” between the tanks and the infantry. The Mohmands, having no word for tanks, called them “the snakes that spit”.

The troops advanced into the Kamalai plateau, the tribal heartland west of the Swat River. The road and water supply had to be extended, taking six weeks, before they could advance into the Nahakki Pass. Then the heights around the Nahakki Pass were taken in a night operation, and after dawn the cavalry went through the pass to the plain beyond. The headquarters, now commanded by General Muspratt, was established about 5 miles south of the Nahakki Pass at Kamalai.

In September a reconnaissance in force southwest of Nahakki was ambushed, with 35 deaths in Mohforce: 2 British and 2 Indian officers, and 1 British and 30 Indian Other Ranks; the operation by the Guides or 5th/12th Frontier Force Regiment was described as “sketchily planned and uncoordinated” 

After fierce fighting, attackers were driven off and British created a campaign to fight the Pashtuns. This put an end to the tribal revolt and order was reinforced. The Badmanai Pass was captured by the British force which ended the tribal hold at Jarobi.

But the septs and subtribes asked for peace at jirgas and agreed to British terms. Order was restored but the British force remained in area till all the fines were collected. After fines were collected, British troops withdrew to British territory towards the end of October.

Captain Godfrey Meynell was awarded a posthumous Victoria Cross for his gallantry on 29 September at the Nahqi Pass.

Background 
The Mohmands are a Pashtun hill tribe who lived north-west of Peshawar, in the North-West Frontier Province of British India; now Khyber Pakhtunkhwa, Pakistan. They moved annually across the border to the hills of Afghanistan to escape the summer heat; the border was delineated by the Durand Line in 1893 but was poorly defined.

See also 
:Category:British military personnel of the Second Mohmand Campaign

References 

1935 in British India
Military history of Pakistan
Wars involving the United Kingdom
Battles involving British India
20th-century military history of the United Kingdom
1935 in India
Conflicts in 1935
Military history of Khyber Pakhtunkhwa
Mohmand campaigns